Ellenburg Center is a hamlet in Clinton County, New York, United States. Ellenburg Center has a post office with ZIP code 12934, which opened on April 19, 1856.

References

Hamlets in Clinton County, New York
Hamlets in New York (state)